Major-General Sir Coleridge Grove  (26 September 1839 – 17 May 1920) was a senior British Army officer who went on to be Military Secretary.

Early life and education
Grove was born in Wandsworth, the second son of Rt. Hon. Sir William Robert Grove, a Welsh judge and scientist, and Emma Maria Towles. He attended Balliol College, Oxford, as an Exhibitioner, where he took first classes in Mathematical Moderations and the final school.

His sister Imogen Emily married William Edward Hall in 1866, while his sister Anna married Herbert Augustus Hills (1837–1907) and was mother to Edmond Herbert Grove-Hills and John Waller Hills.

Military career
Grove was commissioned into the 15th Regiment of Foot in 1863. He went on to serve in Egypt and Sudan. He became Aide-de-Camp to the Governor-General of Ireland in 1882 and Deputy Assistant Adjutant-General at Army Headquarters in 1883 moving on to be Private Secretary to the Secretary of State for War in 1886 and Assistant Adjutant-General at Headquarters after that.

Appointed Military Secretary in 1896, he developed plans for universal military training in the British Army. He retired in 1901.

In retirement, he was Colonel of the East Yorkshire Regiment from November 1901 to 1920.

He had in his possessions a large Elizabethan chest which was lost in a great fire in Brussels in 1910. He died in 1920.

References

 

1839 births
1920 deaths
People from Wandsworth
Alumni of Balliol College, Oxford
British Army major generals
Knights Commander of the Order of the Bath
East Yorkshire Regiment officers
British Army personnel of the Mahdist War
Military personnel from London